AER or Aer may refer to:

Biology 
 Aerides, an orchid genus, abbreviated Aer
 Agranular endoplasmic reticulum, a cell organelle
 Apical ectodermal ridge, critical component of vertebrate limb development
 Albumin Excretion Rate

Finance  
 Annual equivalent rate, a notational interest rate
 Average earnings ratio, in stocks
 Administrative expense ratio, a ratio of general and administrative expenses to total revenue

Languages 
 Aer language, an Indo-Aryan language of Pakistan
 Eastern Arrernte language, an Arandic dialect cluster of Australia (ISO-639: aer)

Music 
 Aer (band), a hip-hop band
 Aer (album), an album by Swiss pianist and composer Nik Bärtsch's band Mobile

Organizations 
 A.E.R. (automobile), a French former car manufacturer
 AER (motorcycles), a British motorcycle manufacturer
 Action For Economic Reforms, a public-interest research organization in the Philippines
 Advanced Engine Research, an endurance racing car engine manufacturer
 AerCap, an aircraft lessor (NYSE stock symbol AER)
 Aer Lingus, airline from Ireland
 Agri-Energy Roundtable, a non-governmental organization accredited by the United Nations
 Algoma Eastern Railway, a former Canadian railway that operated in the province of Ontario
 Annual Equivalent Rate, as used in the UK
 Atmospheric and Environmental Research, an American scientific research agency owned by Verisk Analytics 
 Army Emergency Relief
 Assembly of European Regions, an independent network of European Regions
 Australian Energy Regulator

Places 
 Aer (Sendai), a skyscraper in Japan
 Sochi International Airport, Russia (IATA airport code)

Publications 
 All England Law Reports, covering the court system in England and Wales
 American Economic Review

Religion and mythology 
 Aër, a liturgical item in the Greek Orthodox Church
 Air (classical element), in Greek mythology

Other uses 
 AER: Memories of Old, a 2017 adventure video game developed by Forgotten Key and published by Daedalic Entertainment
 All-electric range, the driving range of a vehicle using only electrical energy for propulsion